Ashokan Ridge is a ridge located in the Catskill Mountains of New York west of Stony Hollow. Morgan Hill is located east, and Gallis Hill is located east-southeast of Ashokan Ridge.

References

Mountains of Ulster County, New York
Mountains of New York (state)